FC Presikhaaf is a Dutch amateur football club from Presikhaaf, Arnhem, founded in 1995. The club has two teams competing on Saturday and Sunday. In season 2012/13, the Saturday team plays in the Vierde Klasse (Fourth Class), while the Sunday team competes in the Eerste Klasse.

The club is formed in 2006 as a merger between VV Ysseloord and SV Rozendaal. Ysseloord founded in 1995 as a merger between VV Presikhaaf (founded in 1951) and OAB (Oost Arnhemse Boys, founded on 21 January 1928). Rozendaal was founded in 1999 as a merger between Sempre Avanti (1951) and SVD'98 (founded in 1971 as WCA, Woonwagen Centum Arnhem, and later renamed as Sport-Vereniging de Del 1998).

The club consists of 5 men senior teams, 7 junior teams, and 3 student teams. FC Presikhaaf plays with its neighbor Eendracht Arnhem in Sportpark Over het Lange Water, which has 2 fields. Since January 2011, the main field has used artificial grass.

References

External links
 Official website

Football clubs in the Netherlands
Football clubs in Arnhem
Association football clubs established in 1995
1995 establishments in the Netherlands